Peacan Grove is a historic building in Church Hill, Jefferson County, Mississippi.

Location
It is located off the Mississippi Highway 551.

Overview
The architectural style is Federal.

It has been listed on the National Register of Historic Places since March 13, 1980.

References

Federal architecture in Mississippi
Houses completed in 1816
Houses on the National Register of Historic Places in Mississippi
Houses in Jefferson County, Mississippi
1816 establishments in Mississippi Territory
National Register of Historic Places in Jefferson County, Mississippi